Bess Taffel Boyle (December 10, 1913 – July 21, 2000) was an American screenwriter, whose career was effectively ended after she was identified as a member of the Communist Party during the McCarthy period.

Taffel is known for writing such films as Elopement.

She wrote only a few  television scripts from 1969 to 1974, before she ended her career entirely. She had worked in the Yiddish theatre before becoming a writer in Hollywood.

Family
She was married to Robert F. Boyle, an Academy Award-winning film production designer and art director, until her death from a stroke in 2000 at age 86. They had no children. Her widower died at the age of 100 on August 1, 2010. His career was not impacted by  his wife's blacklisting.

Writing work
 Needles and Pins (TV series; 1 episode, 1974)
"With Such Enemies"
 
 Marcus Welby, M.D." (TV series)
"Please Don't Send Flowers" (1 episode, 1972)

 Bracken's World (TV series; 2 episodes, 1969–1970)
"A Perfect Piece of Casting" (1 episode, 1970)
"Closed Set" (1 episode, 1969)

 Elopement (1951; writer)
 A Likely Story (1947; writer)
 Badman's Territory (1946; writer)

References

External links
 

1913 births
2000 deaths
American communists
Jewish American screenwriters
Screenwriters from New York (state)
American television writers
Hollywood blacklist
Writers from New York City
Yiddish theatre performers
20th-century American screenwriters